Neofriseria pseudoterrella is a moth of the family Gelechiidae. It was described by Rebel in 1928. It is found in Spain.

The wingspan is about 16 mm. The forewings are brownish with three ill-defined black spots.

References

Moths described in 1928
Neofriseria